"Payasos" (English: "Clowns") is a song by American singer Romeo Santos with Dominican singer Frank Reyes. It is the third single for Santos' fourth studio album Utopía (2019). The music video was released on May 23, 2019. It was filmed in Washington Heights, New York City. Most of it was filmed at the United Palace. It was directed and produced by Joaquín Cambre.

Charts

Weekly charts

Year-end charts

References 

2019 singles
2019 songs
Bachata songs
Romeo Santos songs
Spanish-language songs
Sony Music Latin singles
Songs written by Romeo Santos
Male vocal duets